Home...Again is a studio album released by Abigail

Track listings
 "You Came" written by Abigail Zsiga, Joel Edwards & Rob Barter - 3:23
 "90 Miles" written by Abigail Zsiga & Michael Patzig - 4:03
 "Songbird" written by Abigail Zsiga & Gustafsson - 4:32
 "Better With You" written by Abigail Zsiga & Dimitri Ehrilch - 4:00
 "It's Not Me" written by Abigail Zsiga, Fredrik Thomander & Anders Wikstrom - 3:52
 "Wide Open" written by Abigail Zsiga & Mattias Gustafsson - 3:59
 "Let It Go" written by Abigail Zsiga & Mattias Gustafsson - 3:13
 "Home...again" written by Abigal Zsiga - 3:26
 "Pity the Fool" written by Abigail Zsiga & Michael Patzig - 3:37
 "Shine" written by Abigail Zsiga & Mattias Gustafsson - 3:47
 "Let the Joy Rise" written by Darryl Zero, Janice Robinson & James Caruso - 3:56

Tracks 1, 3, 6, 7, & 10 produced by Mattias Gustafsson. Recording engineer Jon D'Uva. Recording & mix engineering Christian "Wicked" Wicht for www.christianwicked.com.
Tracks 2 & 9 produced & engineer Michael Patzig. Mix engineer Jon D'Uva.
Tracks 5, 8, & 11 produced by Abigail Zsiga. Track 5 recording engineer joe Carrano & Andrew Zsigmond. Mix engineer Christian "Wicked" Wicht. Track 8 engineered & mixed by Jon D'Uva. Track 11 recording engineer Joe Carrano. Mix engineer Jon D'Uva.

Recorded at Sonalyst Studios, Pavonia Studio, Nine Lives Studio, Moomba Studio, Performance Anxietgy Studio & Conduit Control Studio.
Mastered by Tommy Dorsey at Masterfonics Studios.

See also
 Abigail (singer)

2005 albums
Abigail (singer) albums